The Engineer Sérgio Motta Dam, formerly known as the Porto Primavera Dam, is an embankment dam on the Paraná River near Rosana in São Paulo, Brazil. It was constructed between 1980 and 1999 for hydroelectric power production, flood control and navigation. An estimated 11 million tropical trees were submerged.

Technical
The dam is named for Sergio Roberto Vieira da Motta, a prominent industrial engineer in São Paulo. At  in length, it is the longest dam in Brazil.

The power plant contains 14 x  Kaplan turbine generators.
Although there are no plans to install them, the power plant has room to accommodate an additional four generators.

History

It was inaugurated in 1999 with the first three generators commissioned in March. In 2000, five more generators came online and by 2001, a total of ten were in operation.

In compensation, the Companhia Energética de São Paulo (CESP) created the  Rio Ivinhema State Park, the  Rio do Peixe State Park, the  Aguapeí State Park and the  Cisalpina Private Natural Heritage Reserve.

In 2005, an infestation of Hydrilla verticillata was discovered in the reservoir, the first time the invasive weed was discovered in Brazil.

See also

 List of power stations in Brazil
Fishermen Tales: Memories of drouned lives (UNESP, Master thesis)
Fishermen's histories: a study with riparians ousted by a hydroelectric power station (Article published in: Revista Psicologia Política)
Space and Subjectivity: study with riparian people (Article published in: Psicologia & Sociedade, v.23)
Impacts of the construction of hydroelectric power stations in the life of the riparian population (Article published in: Emancipação, v.9)

References

Sources

Dams completed in 1999
Energy infrastructure completed in 1999
Energy infrastructure completed in 2000
Energy infrastructure completed in 2001
Dams in São Paulo (state)
Hydroelectric power stations in Brazil
Embankment dams
Dams on the Paraná River
Locks of Brazil
1999 establishments in Brazil
Dams with fish ladders